Young, Gifted, & Badd: The Remixes is the first remix album by American group Color Me Badd. It also featured another hit single "Forever Love" (U.S. number 15), featured on the Mo' Money soundtrack.

Track listing
 "Color Me Badd [Mark Murray Remix]" (Straite, Elliot) - 5:03
 "I Wanna Sex You Up [Howie Tee Remix]" (Wright, Betty/Straite, Elliot/Clarke, Willie) - 4:23
 "Forever Love" (Color Me Badd/Lewis, Terry/Harris, James Producer) - 5:12
 "Slow Motion [Howie Tee Remix]" (Color Me Badd/Thompson, Howard) - 4:35
 "Thinkin' Back [D.C. Go Mix]" (Color Me Badd/Taylor, Troy/Lee, Hamza) - 5:28
 "Your da One I Onena Love [T-Bone & Mr. Woody Remix]" (Color Me Badd/Thompson, Howard) - 4:09
 "I Adore Mi Amor [Prelude]" - :57
 "I Adore Mi Amor [Hamza's Mix]" (Color Me Badd/Lee, Hamza) - 5:17
 "Roll the Dice [Nick Mundy Remix]" (Mundy, Nick/Gomez, Gina) - 5:08
 "All 4 Love [Howie Tee Remix]" (Color Me Badd/Cropper, Steve/Hayes, Isaac/Thompson, Howard) - 4:19
 "C.M.B. [Postlude]" (Color Me Badd/Murray, Mark) - :55

Singles
 Forever Love - September 24, 1992

References

External links
 Amazon.com

Color Me Badd albums
1992 remix albums
Giant Records (Warner) remix albums
Reprise Records remix albums
Albums produced by Howie Tee